Possessed is an Inverted Impulse launched roller coaster located at Dorney Park & Wildwater Kingdom in Allentown, Pennsylvania. Manufactured by Intamin and designed by Werner Stengel, the roller coaster originally debuted at Six Flags Ohio amusement park as Superman: Ultimate Escape on May 5, 2000. After Cedar Fair purchased the park and renamed it back to Geauga Lake in early 2004, the coaster was immediately renamed Steel Venom. The ride closed in 2006 and was moved to Dorney Park. It reopened in 2008 briefly under the name Voodoo, and was renamed Possessed for the 2009 season. The model is identical to five other impulse coaster installations at other amusement parks. A larger version called Wicked Twister was located at Cedar Point until its closure in September 2021.

History

Geauga Lake era (2000–2006)

The ride opened on May 5, 2000 at Six Flags Ohio as Superman: Ultimate Escape. It was based on the DC Comics character Superman. Following Cedar Fair's acquisition of the park in 2004, in which the original Geauga Lake name was reinstituted to the park, all Looney Tunes and DC Comics branding owned by Six Flags was removed. In the process, the coaster was renamed Steel Venom, while receiving a new logo with a black background featuring a silver and purple snake. Even though Cedar Fair removed any mentions of Superman from the ride, the original blue, red, and yellow color scheme remained intact.

The coaster was dismantled after the 2006 season and put into storage. At the end of the 2007 season, Cedar Fair announced the amusement park section of the park would close and the park would operate exclusively as Wildwater Kingdom. Many rides at the park were relocated to other parks in the Cedar Fair chain.

Dorney Park era (2007–present)
Steel Venom was relocated to Dorney Park, where it reopened as Voodoo several weeks into the 2008 season on May 17, 2008. Prior to opening at Dorney Park, it was repainted to its current color scheme, as shown in the picture above, the supports were repainted teal and the track was repainted yellow. In 2009, the name was changed to Possessed after Six Flags expressed concerns over the name Voodoo, which it had recently trademarked for another ride. Instead of challenging, Cedar Fair opted to appease Six Flags and rename the coaster. Cedar Fair turned the incident into a marketing opportunity, which focused on a story that the ride was overtaken by evil spirits, fitting in line with the ride's original theme.

Possessed was closed for the entire 2020 season due to the COVID-19 pandemic. It reopened in 2021.

Design
The coaster's layout consists of two vertical spikes, one twisted and the other straight vertical with a holding brake, connected by a launch and station tract to form a basic "U" layout. The original ride began with riders being launched forward by the use of linear induction motors. After the initial launch, the train heads up the twisted vertical spike that twists the train 180 degrees. The train then falls and is launched backwards up the vertical spike. It shuttles back and forth three times. During the ride's initial years, the holding brake at the top of the vertical rear spike would engage on the final launch, locking the train in place for a very brief moment. This holding brake is no longer operational. Valleyfair's Steel Venom is currently the only Intamin impulse coaster in the United States still operating with its holding brake.

The maximum G-force of the ride is 3.7 Gs, expectantly low for a twisted impulse coaster.

Gallery

References

External links

Possessed official page
Video of Possessed

Roller coasters in Pennsylvania
Roller coasters introduced in 2000
Roller coasters introduced in 2008
Roller coasters operated by Cedar Fair
Amusement rides that closed in 2006